Gyula Belloni (6 February 1904 – 28 June 1977) was a Hungarian middle-distance runner. He competed in the men's 1500 metres at the 1928 Summer Olympics.

References

1904 births
1977 deaths
Athletes (track and field) at the 1928 Summer Olympics
Hungarian male middle-distance runners
Olympic athletes of Hungary
Place of birth missing
20th-century Hungarian people